The politics of Houston in the U.S. state of Texas are complex and constantly shifting in part because the city is one of the fastest growing major cities in the United States and is the largest without zoning laws. Houston was founded in 1836 and incorporated in 1837. The city is the county seat of Harris County. A portion of southwest Houston extends into Fort Bend County and a small portion in the northeast extends into Montgomery County.

The city of Houston has a strong mayor–council government. The City's elected officials, serving four-year terms, are: the mayor, the city comptroller and 16 members of the city council. Under the strong mayor-council government, the mayor serves as the executive officer of the city. As the city's chief administrator and official representative, the mayor is responsible for the general management of the city and for seeing that all laws and ordinances are enforced.

As the result of a 1991 referendum in Houston, the two-year term was amended to elected officials who can serve up to three terms until 2015 where the three-term limit and two-year terms were replaced with a two four-year terms – a mayor is elected for a four-year term (previously the mayor, controller, and councilmembers are elected to a two-year term prior to the November 3, 2015 city elections), and can be elected to as many as two consecutive terms. City council members, who also have a three-term limit, are elected from eleven districts in the city, along with five at-large council members, who represent the entire city. Term limits with the City of Houston are absolute – past elected officeholders are prohibited from campaigning for their former council positions (which includes the mayor and city controller). The current mayor of Houston is Sylvester Turner.

The city council lineup was based on a U.S. Justice Department mandate which took effect in 1979. Under the current city charter, when the population in the Houston city limits passed 2.2 million residents, the nine-member city council districts expanded to include two more city council districts. The municipal elections held on November 8, 2011, included the newly formed Districts J (located in the Greater Sharpstown area) and K (a section of Southwest Houston, Reliant Park, and Fort Bend County located within the Houston City Limits) where 2 candidates won over 50% of the vote. Houston is a home rule city and all municipal elections in the state of Texas are nonpartisan.

Many local lawmakers have been impacted by the city's term limits. Several former city officials—Anthony Hall, Rodney Ellis, Sheila Jackson-Lee, Sylvia Garcia, Martha Wong, Chris Bell, Annise Parker, Shelley Sekula-Gibbs, Adrian Garcia, Ed Gonzalez, and Mike Sullivan—chose to run for other elected positions once their terms expired or shortly before they were due to expire.

Former mayor Lee P. Brown denounced the term limits, saying they prevented incumbents from gaining enough experience in city government. A proposal to double the current two-year term of office has been debated—as of 2005, several candidates for the city council have brought up the issue of whether term limits should be amended or eliminated. Some elected officials from the Greater Houston area within the Texas Legislature—primarily Garnet Coleman and Sylvester Turner—have also spoken out against term limits.  In 2010, a term limits review commission appointed by former mayor Bill White called for amending the city charter on extending term limits where elected officials could serve two four-year terms; the proposal failed 8.18.10 after the Houston City Council voted 7–7. The November 3, 2015 City of Houston municipal elections a referendum on the voter ballot have amended the term limit law where elected officials can serve two four-year terms - this measure does not abolish term limits nor have a reeligibility provision for past elected officeholders who served their full tenure under the 1991 term limit ordinance. Incumbents who have won re-election during the 2015 election under the three-term rule - those who served 2 are granted an additional 4 years while a freshman councilmember are granted their 2 additional terms - this means that some elected officials can hold up to 10 years in office (if a freshman councilmember who served during their 2014-16 term) or 8 years in office (for those elected in 2011 and re-elected to their final term).

Houston has voted Democratic for the more than a decade and is liberal leaning. Currently, the majority of Houston elected officials are Democrats, and the city’s mayors have been Democrats for over 20 years. The city has become the most ethnically diverse city in the United States with immigrants from all over the world, adding a unique dimension to the city's politics.  approximately 28% of the city's population is immigrants and there is no single identifiable ethnic group that holds a majority in the city. Harris county on the other hand is known as a swing County especially after the recent 2022 midterm election for county judge. Republicans nearly ousted County judge Lina Hidalgo in November 2022 and came within 1 percentage point of sending Republican firebrand Alexandra del Moral Mealer to County office. Mealer ended up with 49% of the vote to Lina Hidalgos' mere 50%.

History
In 1912 the Government of Texas passed an amendment to the Texas Constitution that allowed the annexation of unincorporated areas. Since then the City of Houston annexed various properties.

Municipal government

Elected officials

Super neighborhoods 
During the administration of Lee P. Brown, starting in the year 2000 the City of Houston began grouping areas into "super neighborhoods." Communities with similar identities, infrastructures, and physical features were grouped into super neighborhoods. These were meant to encourage residents to come together to address the needs of their individual communities. Super Neighborhood Councils (made up of residents and stakeholders) are intended to be a "middle man" between the super neighborhood and the City of Houston.

Parks and Recreation Department 
The City of Houston Parks and Recreation Department was created by a city ordinance on March 15, 1916. When it was created it had two parks, Hermann Park and Sam Houston Park. As of 2010 the department maintains about 350 developed parks and 200 esplanades and greenspaces inside and outside of the City of Houston.

Houston Airport System 

The Houston Airport System manages three airports in the Houston city limits: George Bush Intercontinental Airport, William P. Hobby Airport, and Ellington Airport.

Courts 

The City of Houston courts try instances of persons or entities violating the municipal code as well as violations of parking and traffic statutes.

County government courts try criminal violations of state law and other civil offenses. Harris County courts, in the post-Furman v. Georgia death penalty period, were more likely to hand down death sentences compared to other courts because the county had the financial resources to pursue capital punishment while other counties, fearful of losing funds, preferred life sentences.

Office of Emergency Management
The Office of Emergency Management coordinates the city's emergency response, and maintains the city's AlertHouston notification system.

Regional agencies
The Houston Housing Authority (HHA) has a board of directors appointed by the Mayor of Houston, but is not a department of the city government.

State government
The Texas Department of Transportation operates the Houston District Office in Houston.

The Texas Department of Criminal Justice (TDCJ) operates the Region III Parole Division headquarters in Houston. The Houston VI district parole office is located on the grounds of the headquarters. The Houston I, Houston II, Houston III, Houston IV, and Houston VII are located in other places in Houston. The Houston V district parole office is in Pasadena. The agency also operates the Joe Kegans Unit state jail facility in Downtown Houston.

The Huntsville Unit in Huntsville serves as the designated regional release center for prisoners arriving in the Houston area. Throughout the history of the Texas Prison System 90% of male prisoners, regardless of where they were being released, were sent to the unit for the final portions of their sentences before being released. Starting in September 2010 the TDCJ instead began to use regional release centers for male prisoners. Female prisoners throughout Texas who are not state jail prisoners or substance abuse felony punishment facility residents are released from the Christina Crain Unit in Gatesville.

The Texas Youth Commission (TYC) operates the Houston District Office in Greater Sharpstown, Houston. The closest TYC correctional facility to Houston is the Al Price State Juvenile Correctional Facility in unincorporated Jefferson County, near Beaumont. The TYC announced that the Al Price facility will close by August 31, 2011.

Federal government

The United States Postal Service's main post office facility is the  Houston Post Office at 401 Franklin Street in Downtown Houston. In February 2009 the U.S. Postal Service announced that it was going to sell the Houston Post Office. The party buying the facility is required to build a replacement facility. The postal service operates station branches in other parts of Houston.

Not all city of Houston residents have "Houston, Texas" mailing addresses since the USPS does not base its mailing address names on actual municipal boundaries; some have Friendswood, Humble, Kingwood, Missouri City, and Stafford postal addresses. After the 1996 annexation of Kingwood, residents retained "Kingwood, Texas" mailing addresses, and some places in the city limits before the annexation had Kingwood mailing addresses. Residents of several other municipalities, including Jacinto City, Jersey Village, Nassau Bay, and West University Place, have "Houston, Texas" mailing addresses, and some residents of Missouri City also have Houston mailing addresses.

The U.S. Citizenship and Immigration Services Houston Field Office and the Houston office of the U.S. Immigration and Customs Enforcement (ICE) are in Greenspoint and in Houston. An ICE Special Agent in Charge (SAC) principal field office is also in Houston. The Houston Contract Detention Facility, operated by the Corrections Corporation of America on behalf of ICE, is located in Houston.

The Federal Reserve Bank of Dallas Houston Branch is located in the Fourth Ward of Houston.

Elected officials
Houston is represented in the United States Congress by U.S. Senators John Cornyn and Ted Cruz and U.S. Representatives Kevin Brady, Lizzie Fletcher, Al Green, Sylvia Garcia, Sheila Jackson Lee, Michael McCaul, Troy Nehls, Brian Babin, and Dan Crenshaw.

Party affiliation
After 1960 and until 2016, Fort Bend County generally voted for Republican candidates in U.S. presidential elections.

58% of Houston area voters in the 2004 U.S. Presidential Election voted for George W. Bush. From 2008 and by 2016 increased urbanization caused an increase in votes for Democratic Party candidates in the Houston area, with several unincorporated areas of Harris County selecting Democrats and with declines in Republican voters in River Oaks, Upper Kirby, and Washington Avenue. In the 2012 U.S. Presidential Election, of the 151 election precincts in Harris County, Barack Obama was selected by majorities of voters in 60 of them.

In the 2016 U.S. Presidential Election, Houston area voters were split nearly evenly between Republican candidate Donald Trump and Democratic candidate Hillary Clinton. Residents of Brazoria, Fort Bend, Harris and Montgomery counties combined had about 20% of the people in Texas who voted for Trump and about 25% of the people in Texas who voted for Clinton. That year Alexa Ura of the Texas Tribune stated that "undeniably" the majority of Harris County voters now selected the Democratic candidate for presidential races. In that election, majorities of voters in 86 Harris County precincts selected Clinton, with the total number of precincts being the same as in 2012.

Circa 2017, there were ethnically mixed precincts in Harris and Fort Bend Counties with majority Republican voters as well as majority Democratic ones. In 2017 county level officers in Fort Bend County remained majority Republican and there was only one Democrat on the county commissioner's court.

Gallery

See also

Harris County, Texas
Fort Bend County, Texas
Montgomery County, Texas

Notes

External links

 Houston
 Houston Data Portal
 174 Years of Historic Houston
 Briar Forest Super Neighborhood
 Office of Emergency Management
 AlertHouston

 
Politics of Texas
Government of Houston